Ivan Korčok (born 4 April 1964) is a Slovak politician. He served as Minister of Foreign and European Affairs in the Matovič Cabinet led by Prime Minister Igor Matovič from April 2020 until his resignation in late March 2021. He was appointed back on the 1 April 2021 under Eduard Heger's Cabinet.

In 2018, he won the Czech and Slovak Transatlantic Award.

On 24 March 2021, he resigned amidst a wave of mass resignations in the Slovak government due to the government's handling of the COVID-19 pandemic in the country. Initially, President Zuzana Čaputová had demanded the resignation of Prime Minister Igor Matovič.

In September 2022 he resigned along with the other SaS-nominated ministers due to a disagreement with the politics of Igor Matovič.

Personal life 

He is married and with wife Soňa has two sons.

Honours and awards

Nongovernmental organizations 
 Slovakia,  Servare et Manere:
  Memorial Medal of Tree of Peace.

References 

1964 births
Ambassadors of Slovakia to Germany
Ambassadors of Slovakia to the United States
Comenius University alumni
Foreign Ministers of Slovakia
Living people
Politicians from Banská Bystrica
Slovak diplomats
20th-century Slovak politicians
21st-century Slovak politicians